Longshan Temple (POJ: Liông-san-sī) may refer to:

 Longshan Temple (Jinjiang), Fujian
 Longshan Temple (Lukang), Changhua, Taiwan
 Lungshan Temple (Taipei), located in Wanhua District (alternately known as Bangka/Mengjia), Taipei, Taiwan
 Fengshan Longshan Temple, Kaohsiung

Buddhist temple disambiguation pages